Dragan Gašević is Professor of Learning Analytics at Monash University. He is a researcher in learning analytics and co-developed several software systems such as P3, rBPMN Editor, LOCO-Analyst, OnTask, OVAL, and ProSolo. He is recognized as Australia's field leader in educational technologies.

Early life and education
Gašević obtained a bachelor's degree in computer science from the Military Technical Academy in Belgrade, Serbia, and a masters in computer science (software engineering) & a doctorate in computer science (artificial intelligence) both from the University of Belgrade. His doctoral supervisor was Vladan Devedžić.

Career
Gašević worked as Postdoctoral Fellow at Simon Fraser University, as Assistant to Full Professor (January 2007 - January 2015) at Athabasca University, as Professor and Sir Tim O'Shea Chair in Learning Analytics and Informatics (February 2015 - February 2018) at the University of Edinburgh, and as Professor of Learning Analytics at Monash University (February 2018 – present). He served as the Canada Research Chair in Semantic and Learning Technologies at Athabasca University (January 2009 - January 2014). He served as Co-Director (Learning Analytics) of the Centre for Research in Digital Education at the University of Edinburgh (November 2015 - February 2018).

Role in Development of Learning Analytics Field

He is a co-founder and was the President (2015-2017) of the Society for Learning Analytics Research. He served as a founding program chair of the International Conference on Learning Analytics & Knowledge (LAK) in 2011 and 2012 and the general chair in 2016 and as a founding program chair of the Learning Analytics Summer Institute in 2013 and 2014. He served as a founding editor of the Journal of Learning Analytics (2012-2017) and as an editor of the Handbook of Learning Analytics.

See also 
Learning analytics
Learning sciences
Educational data mining
Ryan S. Baker
Arthur C. Graesser
George Siemens

References

External links
Dragan Gašević's webpage http://sfu.ca/~dgasevic

1976 births
Living people
University of Belgrade alumni
Academic staff of Monash University